Domenico Rossi (28 December 1657 – 8 March 1737) was a Swiss-Italian architect.

Biography
He was born in Morcote,  Ticino, and was a pupil of Baldassarre Longhena. Later he became family architect of the noble Venetian houses of Dolfin, Savorgnan and Manin. In 1701 he directed the restoration of Palazzo Dolfin and in 1709 he was commissioned the renovation of the façade of San Stae church. 

In 1713 he designed the Baroque church of the Gesuiti, also in Venice, while in 1714-1715 he worked at the church of Ljubljana's Križanke, in the shape of a Greek cross. In 1724 he built the Ca' Corner della Regina. One of his last works was the renovation of the Cathedral of Udine.

Rossi died in 1737 in Venice.

References

1657 births
1737 deaths
Architects from Ticino
17th-century Italian architects
18th-century Italian architects
Architects from Venice